The Ministry of Planning Development & Special Initiatives (abbreviated as MoPD) is headed by the Minister for Planning Development & Special Initiatives, who must be a member of Parliament of Pakistan. The minister is also deputy chairman of Planning Commission of Pakistan. But currently, a different deputy chairman is appointed, Jahanzeb Khan. The administrative head of the Ministry is the Planning and Development Secretary of Pakistan.

Planning Commission of Pakistan

The main division under the ministry is the Planning Commission of Pakistan which responsible for financial and public policy development institution of the Government of Pakistan. The Planning Commission undertakes research studies and state policy development initiatives for the growth of national economy and the expansion of the public and state infrastructure of the country.

Vision 2025
The Vision 2025 is the country's long–term development blueprint which aims to create a globally competitive and prosperous country providing a high quality of life for all its citizens.

Priority areas
 Integrated Energy
 Modernization of Infrastructure
 Institutionalreform and modernization of the public sector
 Value-addition in Commodity Producing Sectors
 Export promotion
 Water and food security
 Private sector-led growth and entrepreneurship

Pakistan Institute of Development Economics

The Pakistan Institute of Development Economics, is a post-graduate research institute, and a public policy think tank located in the vicinity of Islamabad, Pakistan.

Pakistan Planning and Management Institute

The Pakistan Planning and Management Institute (PPMI) is the one of the division of Planning Commission. The main objectives of PPMI are
to improve technical and analytical skills and enhance expertise of the federal, provincial and district governments’ officers through training in
areas of Project Management, Social development and application of Information Technology in Project management.

Federal Drought Emergency Relief Assistance (DERA) Unit

The function of DERA Unit is to facilitate the implementation of the project in the drought-hit areas of all the four provinces and coordinate activities carried out in the provinces to mitigate the effects of drought.

National Fertilizer Development Centre

The National Fertilizer Development Centre (NFDC) was set up by the Government in 1977.With the help of foreign funding NFDC studies all fertilizer-related problems from the supply source to the farmers' fields, with a view to helping in the formulation of Government policies and their implementation and to give support to other institutions.

See also
 National Logistics Cell
 Economy of Pakistan

External links
 Ministry of Planning and Development
 National Fertilizer Development Centre
 Pakistan Institute of Development Economics

References 

Economic planning in Pakistan
 
Pakistan